Kościelec (2,155 m above sea level) is a mountain in the High Tatras in the Gąsienicowa Valley of Poland.

In popular culture
On February 8, 1909, the composer Mieczysław Karłowicz was killed at the age of 32 by an avalanche while skiing in the Kościelec mountain. This incident was commemorated by Wojciech Kilar in his tone poem Kościelec 1909, composed in 1976.

References

High Tatras
Mountains of the Western Carpathians
Two-thousanders of Poland